Goran Vrbanc (born October 8, 1984) is a Croatian professional basketball player who last played for Apollon Patras of the Greek A2 League.

Career 
Vrbanc debuted with the Croatian basketball club KK Rijeka in 2003. In 2006, he moved to Croatian powerhouse Cibona Zagreb, then to the Bosnian Široki Eronet, and finally back to Croatian KK Cibona and KK Zadar. He played three seasons in the Euroleague with Cibona, averaging a high of 6.3 points per game during his debut season with the club. In January 2014, he signed with BC Lietkabelis.

On 27 October 2016, he signed for Karpoš Sokoli

On 17 July 2017, he signed for Apollon Patras of the Greek A2 League.

References

External links 
 Adriatic League profile
 Euroleague.net Profile
 DraftExpress.com Profile

Living people
1984 births
ABA League players
AZS Koszalin players
Croatian men's basketball players
HKK Široki players
KK Cibona players
KK Zadar players
KK Zagreb players
Basketball players from Rijeka
Szolnoki Olaj KK players
BC Lietkabelis players
Shooting guards
KK Kvarner players